Cryptocolea is a genus of liverworts belonging to the family Solenostomataceae.

The species of this genus are found mostly in subarctic regions.

Species:
 Cryptocolea imbricata R.M.Schust.

References

Jungermanniales
Jungermanniales genera